Luigi Carlo Filippo Russolo (30 April 1885 – 4 February 1947) was an Italian Futurist painter, composer, builder of experimental musical instruments, and the author of the manifesto The Art of Noises (1913). He is often regarded as one of the first noise music experimental composers with his performances of noise music concerts in 1913–14 and then again after World War I, notably in Paris in 1921. He designed and constructed a number of noise-generating devices called Intonarumori. Russolo is also associated with Italian fascism, for example through exhibiting his work at exhibitions sponsored by Mussolini's government, and through collaboration with Marinetti, author of the Fascist Manifesto.

Biography

Luigi Russolo was perhaps the first noise artist. His 1913 manifesto, L'Arte dei Rumori (The Art of Noises), stated that the industrial revolution had given modern men a greater capacity to appreciate more complex sounds. Russolo found traditional melodic music confining, and he envisioned noise music as its future replacement.

Russolo designed and constructed a number of noise-generating devices called Intonarumori, and assembled a noise orchestra to perform with them. A performance of his Gran Concerto Futuristico (1917) was met with strong disapproval and violence from the audience, as Russolo himself had predicted.

None of his intoning instruments have survived: some were destroyed in World War II; while others have been lost. Replicas of the instruments have since been built and performed. (See the Intonarumori page.)

Although Russolo's works bear little resemblance to modern noise music, his pioneering creations cannot be overlooked as an essential stage in the evolution of the several genres in this category. Many artists are now familiar with Russolo's manifesto.

Collaboration with Antonio Russolo
Antonio Russolo, another Italian Futurist composer and Luigi's brother, produced a recording of two works featuring the original Intonarumori. The phonograph recording, made in 1921, included works entitled Corale and Serenata, which combined conventional orchestral music set against the sound of the noise machines. It is the only surviving contemporaneous sound recording of Luigi Russolo's noise music. Russolo and Filippo Tommaso Marinetti gave the first concert of Futurist music, complete with intonarumori, in April 1914, causing a riot. The program comprised four Noise Networks.

Gallery

See also

 Ugo Piatti
 List of noise musicians

Notes

References 

 Chessa, Luciano: Luigi Russolo, Futurist: Noise, Visual Arts, and the Occult. University of California Press, 2012.
 Luigi Russolo, The Art of Noise (Futurist Manifesto, 1913), translated by Robert Filliou

External links

 Printed works by Luigi Russolo digitalized on Internet Archive by the Archivio del '900 of Mart Museum, Rovereto, Italy.
 Russolo, Luigi Carlo Filippo. Dizionario Biografico degli Italiani (2017). 
Media Art Net | Russolo, Luigi: Intonarumori (at medienkunstnetz.de) 
Archive Russolo recordings at LTM
Peggy Guggenheim Collection: Luigi Russolo
Bob Osborn's Futurism: Luigi Russolo
Prof. Russolo & His Noise Intoners

Audio
 Corale, Serenata by Antonio Russolo and Luigi Russolo (1924) were published on cassette in 1988 in the Audio By Visual Artists edition of Tellus Audio Cassette Magazine #21 and are archived on the internet at Ubuweb
Three audio clips by Luigi Russolo: Serenata, Corale and Risveglio di una città

Video

Italian musical instrument makers
Italian classical composers
Italian male classical composers
20th-century classical composers
19th-century Italian painters
Italian male painters
20th-century Italian painters
Italian Futurist painters
Futurist composers
Noise musicians
Italian experimental musicians
Experimental composers
1885 births
1947 deaths
People from Portogruaro
Inventors of musical instruments
20th-century Italian composers
20th-century Italian male musicians
Italian composers
19th-century Italian inventors
20th-century Italian inventors
19th-century Italian male artists
20th-century Italian male artists